Jaan Pehk (also known as Orelipoiss; born 13 June 1975 in Palivere) is an Estonian writer, singer and guitarist.

Pehk is a member of the Young Authors' Association in Tartu and the Estonian Writers' Union.

Discography

Collaborations
Claire's Birthday
Venus (2000) 
City Loves (2001) 
Future Is Now (2003)
Koer
Pure (2004) 
Köök
Telegramm (2006) 
Orelipoiss
Ma olen terve (2004)
Vana mees (2004)
Naisi (2005)
Üheksakümmendüheksa (2007)
Õnn (2010)
Sünnipäev (2018)

References

External links

1975 births
Living people
People from Lääne-Nigula Parish
21st-century Estonian poets
Estonian male poets
21st-century Estonian male singers
Estonian guitarists
Estonian songwriters
21st-century guitarists
Eurovision Song Contest entrants of 2003
Eurovision Song Contest entrants for Estonia
Eesti Laul contestants